Milea is a village and a community of the Kozani municipality. Before the 2011 local government reform it was part of the municipality of Elimeia, of which it was a municipal district. The 2011 census recorded 173 inhabitants in the community. The community of Milea covers an area of 5.388 km2.

References

Populated places in Kozani (regional unit)